Ferenc Sebő (born February 10, 1947, in Szekszárd) is a Hungarian folklorist and musician, best known as the bandleader for the Sebő Ensemble, a band that produced many future stars, including Márta Sebestyén (later of Muzsikás).  The Sebő Ensemble was one of the best-known groups of the Hungarian roots revival in the 1970s.

References

1947 births
Living people
Hungarian musicians
21st-century conductors (music)